Eodorcadion potanini is a species of beetle in the family Cerambycidae. It was described by Jakovlev in 1889.

References

Dorcadiini
Beetles described in 1889